Meadow Road was a cricket ground in Beeston, Nottinghamshire.  The first recorded match on the ground was in 1867, when the Gentlemen of Nottinghamshire played the Gentlemen of Lincolnshire.  In 1870, the ground hosted its only first-class match when the Gentlemen of the North played the Gentlemen of the South.  The last recorded match on the ground came in 1961 when Nottinghamshire Juniors played Derbyshire Juniors.

The ground is today covered by a technology park.

References

External links
Meadow Road on CricketArchive
Meadow Road on Cricinfo

Defunct cricket grounds in England
Cricket grounds in Nottinghamshire
Defunct sports venues in Nottinghamshire
Sports venues completed in 1867
1867 establishments in England
Beeston, Nottinghamshire